Jerusalem is a city in Western Asia. Situated on a plateau in the Judaean Mountains between the Mediterranean and the Dead Sea, it is one of the oldest cities in the world and is considered to be a holy city for the three major Abrahamic religions: Judaism, Christianity, and Islam. Both Israelis and Palestinians claim Jerusalem as their capital, as Israel maintains its primary governmental institutions there and the State of Palestine ultimately foresees it as its seat of power. Because of this dispute, neither claim is widely recognized internationally.

Throughout its long history, Jerusalem has been destroyed at least twice, besieged 23 times, captured and recaptured 44 times, and attacked 52 times. The part of Jerusalem called the City of David shows first signs of settlement in the 4th millennium BCE, in the shape of encampments of nomadic shepherds. During the Canaanite period (14th century BCE), Jerusalem was named as Urusalim on ancient Egyptian tablets, probably meaning "City of Shalem" after a Canaanite deity. During the Israelite period, significant construction activity in Jerusalem began in the 9th century BCE (Iron Age II), and by the 8th century BCE, the city had developed into the religious and administrative centre of the Kingdom of Judah. In 1538, the city walls were rebuilt for a last time around Jerusalem under Suleiman the Magnificent of the Ottoman Empire. Today those walls define the Old City, which has been traditionally divided into four-quarters – known since the early 19th century as the Armenian, Christian, Jewish, and Muslim quarters. The Old City became a World Heritage Site in 1981, and is on the List of World Heritage in Danger. Since 1860, Jerusalem has grown far beyond the Old City's boundaries. In 2022, Jerusalem had a population of some 971,800 residents, of which almost 60% were Jews and almost 40% Palestinians. In 2020, the population was 951,100, of which Jews comprised 570,100 (59.9%), Muslims 353,800 (37.2%), Christians 16,300 (1.7%), and 10,800 unclassified (1.1%).

According to the Hebrew Bible, King David conquered the city from the Jebusites and established it as the capital of the United Kingdom of Israel, and his son, King Solomon, commissioned the building of the First Temple. Modern scholars argue that Jews branched out of the Canaanite peoples and culture through the development of a distinct monolatrous—and later monotheistic—religion centred on El/Yahweh. These foundational events, straddling the dawn of the 1st millennium BCE, assumed central symbolic importance for the Jewish people. The sobriquet of holy city was probably attached to Jerusalem in post-exilic times. The holiness of Jerusalem in Christianity, conserved in the Greek translation of the Hebrew Bible, which Christians adopted as their own "Old Testament", was reinforced by the New Testament account of Jesus's crucifixion and resurrection there. In Sunni Islam, Jerusalem is the third-holiest city, after Mecca and Medina. The city was the first qibla, the standard direction for Muslim prayers (salah), and in Islamic tradition, Muhammad made his Night Journey there in 621, ascending to heaven where he speaks to God, according to the Quran. As a result, despite having an area of only , the Old City is home to many sites of seminal religious importance, among them the Temple Mount with its Western Wall, Dome of the Rock and al-Aqsa Mosque, and the Church of the Holy Sepulchre.

Today, the status of Jerusalem remains one of the core issues in the Israeli–Palestinian conflict. During the 1948 Arab–Israeli War, West Jerusalem was among the areas captured and later annexed by Israel while East Jerusalem, including the Old City, was captured and later annexed by Jordan. Israel captured East Jerusalem from Jordan during the 1967 Six-Day War and subsequently effectively annexed it into Jerusalem, together with additional surrounding territory. One of Israel's Basic Laws, the 1980 Jerusalem Law, refers to Jerusalem as the country's undivided capital. All branches of the Israeli government are located in Jerusalem, including the Knesset (Israel's parliament), the residences of the Prime Minister (Beit Aghion) and President (Beit HaNassi), and the Supreme Court. The international community rejects the annexation as illegal and treats East Jerusalem as Palestinian territory occupied by Israel.

Etymology and names

Etymology
The name "Jerusalem" is variously etymologized to mean "foundation (Semitic yry''' 'to found, to lay a cornerstone') of the god Shalem"; the god Shalem was thus the original tutelary deity of the Bronze Age city.

Shalim or Shalem was the name of the god of dusk in the Canaanite religion, whose name is based on the same root S-L-M from which the Hebrew word for "peace" is derived (Shalom in Hebrew, cognate with Arabic Salam).Ringgren, H., Die Religionen des Alten Orients (Göttingen, 1979), 212. The name thus offered itself to etymologizations such as "The City of Peace", "Abode of Peace", "Dwelling of Peace" ("founded in safety"), or "Vision of Peace" in some Christian authors.

The ending -ayim indicates the dual, thus leading to the suggestion that the name Yerushalayim refers to the fact that the city initially sat on two hills. (see )

Ancient Egyptian sources
The Execration Texts of the Middle Kingdom of Egypt (c. 19th century BCE), which refer to a city called rwšꜣlmm or ꜣwšꜣmm, variously transcribed as Rušalimum, Urušalimum or Rôsh-ramen, may indicate Jerusalem.G. Johannes Botterweck, Helmer Ringgren (eds.) Theological Dictionary of the Old Testament, (tr. David E. Green) William B. Eerdmann, Grand Rapids Michigan, Cambridge, UK 1990, Vol. VI, p. 348 Alternatively, the Amarna letters of Abdi-Heba (1330s BCE), which reference an Úrušalim, may be the earliest mention of the city.

Hebrew Bible and Jewish sources
The form Yerushalem or Yerushalayim first appears in the Bible, in the Book of Joshua. According to a Midrash, the name is a combination of two names united by God, Yireh ("the abiding place", the name given by Abraham to the place where he planned to sacrifice his son) and Shalem ("Place of Peace", the name given by high priest Shem).

Oldest written mention of Jerusalem
One of the earliest extra-biblical Hebrew writing of the word Jerusalem is dated to the sixth or seventh century BCEKing Manasseh and Child Sacrifice: Biblical Distortions of Historical Realities by Francesca Stavrakopoulou p. 98 and was discovered in Khirbet Beit Lei near Beit Guvrin in 1961. The inscription states: "I am Yahweh thy God, I will accept the cities of Judah and I will redeem Jerusalem",The Mountain of the Lord by Benyamin Mazar p. 60 or as other scholars suggest: "Yahweh is the God of the whole earth. The mountains of Judah belong to him, to the God of Jerusalem".Discovering the World of the Bible by LaMar C. Berrett p. 178 An older example on papyrus is known from the previous century.

In extra-biblical inscriptions, the earliest known example of the -ayim ending was discovered on a column about 3 km west of ancient Jerusalem, dated to the first century BCE.

Jebus, Zion, City of David
An ancient settlement of Jerusalem, founded as early as the Bronze Age on the hill above the Gihon Spring, was, according to the Bible, named Jebus. Called the "Fortress of Zion" (metsudat Zion), it was renamed as the "City of David", and was known by this name in antiquity. Another name, "Zion", initially referred to a distinct part of the city, but later came to signify the city as a whole, and afterwards to represent the whole biblical Land of Israel.

Greek, Roman and Byzantine names
In Greek and Latin, the city's name was transliterated Hierosolyma (Greek: Ἱεροσόλυμα; in Greek hieròs, ἱερός, means holy), although the city was renamed Aelia Capitolina for part of the Roman period of its history.

Salem
The Aramaic Apocryphon of Genesis of the Dead Sea Scrolls (1QapGen 22:13) equates Jerusalem with the earlier "Salem" (שלם), said to be the kingdom of Melchizedek in Genesis 14. Other early Hebrew sources, early Christian renderings of the verse and targumim, however, put Salem in Northern Israel near Shechem (Sichem), now Nablus, a city of some importance in early sacred Hebrew writing. Possibly the redactor of the Apocryphon of Genesis wanted to dissociate Melchizedek from the area of Shechem, which at the time was in possession of the Samaritans. However that may be, later Rabbinic sources also equate Salem with Jerusalem, mainly to link Melchizedek to later Temple traditions.

Arabic names

The  (Q) is pronounced either with a voiceless uvular plosive (/q/), as in Classical Arabic, or with a glottal stop (ʔ) as in Levantine Arabic. Palestinian Arab families who hail from this city are often called "Qudsi" or "Maqdisi", while Palestinian Muslim Jerusalemites may use these terms as a demonym.

History

Given the city's central position in both Jewish nationalism (Zionism) and Palestinian nationalism, the selectivity required to summarize some 5,000 years of inhabited history is often influenced by ideological bias or background. Israeli or Jewish nationalists claim a right to the city based on Jewish indigeneity to the land, particularly their origins in and descent from the Israelites, for whom Jerusalem is their capital, and their yearning for return."For three thousand years, Jerusalem has been the center of Jewish hope and longing. No other city has played such a dominant role in the history, culture, religion and consciousness of a people as has Jerusalem in the life of Jewry and Judaism. Throughout centuries of exile, Jerusalem remained alive in the hearts of Jews everywhere as the focal point of Jewish history, the symbol of ancient glory, spiritual fulfillment and modern renewal. This heart and soul of the Jewish people engenders the thought that if you want one simple word to symbolize all of Jewish history, that word would be 'Jerusalem.'" Teddy Kollek (DC: Washington Institute For Near East Policy, 1990), pp. 19–20. In contrast, Palestinian nationalists claim the right to the city based on modern Palestinians' longstanding presence and descent from many different peoples who have settled or lived in the region over the centuries."(With reference to Palestinians in Ottoman times) Although proud of their Arab heritage and ancestry, the Palestinians considered themselves to be descended not only from Arab conquerors of the seventh century but also from indigenous peoples who had lived in the country since time immemorial, including the ancient Hebrews and the Canaanites before them. Acutely aware of the distinctiveness of Palestinian history, the Palestinians saw themselves as the heirs of its rich associations." Walid Khalidi, 1984, Before Their Diaspora: A Photographic History of the Palestinians, 1876–1948. Institute for Palestine Studies Both sides claim the history of the city has been politicized by the other in order to strengthen their relative claims to the city, and that this is borne out by the different focuses the different writers place on the various events and eras in the city's history.

Overview of Jerusalem's historical periods (by rulers)

Prehistory
The first archaeological evidence of human presence in the area comes in the form of flints dated to between 6000 and 7000 years ago, with ceramic remains appearing during the Chalcolithic period, and the first signs of permanent settlement appearing in the Early Bronze Age in 3000–2800 BCE.

Late Bronze Age

The earliest evidence of city fortifications appear in the Mid to Late Bronze Age and could date to around the 18th century BCE. By around 1550-1200 BCE, Jerusalem was the capital of an Egyptian vassal city-state, a modest settlement governing a few outlying villages and pastoral areas, with a small Egyptian garrison and ruled by appointees such as king Abdi-Heba, At the time of Seti I (r. 1290–1279 BCE) and Ramesses II (r. 1279–1213 BCE), major construction took place as prosperity increased. The city's inhabitants at this time were Canaanites, who are believed by scholars to have evolved into the Israelites via the development of a distinct Yahweh-centric monotheistic belief system.Mark Smith in "The Early History of God: Yahweh and Other Deities of Ancient Israel" states "Despite the long regnant model that the Canaanites and Israelites were people of fundamentally different culture, archaeological data now casts doubt on this view. The material culture of the region exhibits numerous common points between Israelites and Canaanites in the Iron I period (c. 1200–1000 BCE). The record would suggest that the Israelite culture largely overlapped with and derived from Canaanite culture... In short, Israelite culture was largely Canaanite in nature. Given the information available, one cannot maintain a radical cultural separation between Canaanites and Israelites for the Iron I period." (pp. 6–7). Smith, Mark (2002) "The Early History of God: Yahweh and Other Deities of Ancient Israel" (Eerdman's)

 Iron Age 

Archaeological remains from the ancient Israelite period include the Siloam Tunnel, an aqueduct built by Judahite king Hezekiah and once containing an ancient Hebrew inscription, known as the Siloam Inscription; the so-called Broad Wall, a defensive fortification built in the 8th century BCE, also by Hezekiah; the Silwan necropolis (9th-7th c. BCE) with the Monolith of Silwan and the Tomb of the Royal Steward, which were decorated with monumental Hebrew inscriptions; and the so-called Israelite Tower, remnants of ancient fortifications, built from large, sturdy rocks with carved cornerstones. A huge water reservoir dating from this period was discovered in 2012 near Robinson's Arch, indicating the existence of a densely built-up quarter across the area west of the Temple Mount during the Kingdom of Judah.

When the Assyrians conquered the Kingdom of Israel in 722 BCE, Jerusalem was strengthened by a great influx of refugees from the northern kingdom. When Hezekiah ruled, Jerusalem had no fewer than 25,000 inhabitants and covered 25 acres (10 hectares).

In 587–586 BCE, Nebuchadnezzar II of the Neo-Babylonian Empire conquered Jerusalem after a prolonged siege, and then systematically destroyed the city, including Solomon's Temple. The Kingdom of Judah was abolished and many were exiled to Babylon. These events mark the end of the First Temple period.

 Biblical account 
This period, when Canaan formed part of the Egyptian empire, corresponds in biblical accounts to Joshua's invasion, but almost all scholars agree that the Book of Joshua holds little historical value for early Israel.

In the Bible, Jerusalem is defined as lying within territory allocated to the tribe of Benjamin though still inhabited by Jebusites. David is said to have conquered these in the siege of Jebus, and transferred his capital from Hebron to Jerusalem which then became the capital of a United Kingdom of Israel, and one of its several religious centres. The choice was perhaps dictated by the fact that Jerusalem did not form part of Israel's tribal system, and was thus suited to serve as the centre of its confederation. Opinion is divided over whether the so-called Large Stone Structure and the nearby Stepped Stone Structure may be identified with King David's palace, or dates to a later period.Finkelstein & Mazar (2007), pp. 113, 125–28, 165, 174. Accessed 30 November 2022.

According to the Bible, King David reigned for 40 years and was succeeded by his son Solomon, who built the Holy Temple on Mount Moriah. Solomon's Temple (later known as the First Temple), went on to play a pivotal role in Jewish religion as the repository of the Ark of the Covenant. On Solomon's death, ten of the northern tribes of Israel broke with the United Monarchy to form their own nation, with its kings, prophets, priests, traditions relating to religion, capitals and temples in northern Israel. The southern tribes, together with the Aaronid priesthood, remained in Jerusalem, with the city becoming the capital of the Kingdom of Judah.

Classical antiquity

In 538 BCE, the Persian King Cyrus the Great invited the Jews of Babylon to return to Judah to rebuild the Temple. Construction of the Second Temple was completed in 516 BCE, during the reign of Darius the Great, 70 years after the destruction of the First Temple.

Sometime soon after 485 BCE Jerusalem was besieged, conquered and largely destroyed by a coalition of neighbouring states. In about 445 BCE, King Artaxerxes I of Persia issued a decree allowing the city (including its walls) to be rebuilt. Jerusalem resumed its role as capital of Judah and centre of Jewish worship.

Many Jewish tombs from the Second Temple period have been unearthed in Jerusalem. One example, discovered north of the Old City, contains human remains in a 1st-century CE ossuary decorated with the Aramaic inscription "Simon the Temple Builder." The Tomb of Abba, also located north of the Old City, bears an Aramaic inscription with Paleo-Hebrew letters reading: "I, Abba, son of the priest Eleaz(ar), son of Aaron the high (priest), Abba, the oppressed and the persecuted, who was born in Jerusalem, and went into exile into Babylonia and brought (back to Jerusalem) Mattathi(ah), son of Jud(ah), and buried him in a cave which I bought by deed." The Tomb of Benei Hezir located in Kidron Valley is decorated by monumental Doric columns and Hebrew inscription, identifying it as the burial site of Second Temple priests. The Tombs of the Sanhedrin, an underground complex of 63 rock-cut tombs, is located in a public park in the northern Jerusalem neighbourhood of Sanhedria. These tombs, probably reserved for members of the Sanhedrin and inscribed by ancient Hebrew and Aramaic writings, are dated to between 100 BCE and 100 CE.

When Alexander the Great conquered the Persian Empire, Jerusalem and Judea came under Macedonian control, eventually falling to the Ptolemaic dynasty under Ptolemy I. In 198 BCE, Ptolemy V Epiphanes lost Jerusalem and Judea to the Seleucids under Antiochus III. The Seleucid attempt to recast Jerusalem as a Hellenized city-state came to a head in 168 BCE with the successful Maccabean revolt of Mattathias and his five sons against Antiochus IV Epiphanes, and their establishment of the Hasmonean Kingdom in 152 BCE with Jerusalem as its capital.

In 63 BCE, Pompey the Great intervened in a struggle for the Hasmonean throne and captured Jerusalem, extending the influence of the Roman Republic over Judea. Following a short invasion by Parthians, backing the rival Hasmonean rulers, Judea became a scene of struggle between pro-Roman and pro-Parthian forces, eventually leading to the emergence of an Edomite named Herod. As Rome became stronger, it installed Herod as a client king of the Jews. Herod the Great, as he was known, devoted himself to developing and beautifying the city. He built walls, towers and palaces, and expanded the Temple Mount, buttressing the courtyard with blocks of stone weighing up to 100 tons. Under Herod, the area of the Temple Mount doubled in size. Shortly after Herod's death, in 6 CE Judea came under direct Roman rule as the Iudaea Province, although the Herodian dynasty through Agrippa II remained client kings of neighbouring territories until 96 CE.

Roman rule over Jerusalem and Judea was challenged in the First Jewish–Roman War (66-73 CE), which ended with a Roman victory. Early on, the city was devastated by a brutal civil war between several Jewish factions fighting for control of the city. In 70 CE, the Romans destroyed Jerusalem and the Second Temple. The contemporary Jewish historian Josephus wrote that the city "was so thoroughly razed to the ground by those that demolished it to its foundations, that nothing was left that could ever persuade visitors that it had once been a place of habitation." Of the 600,000 (Tacitus) or 1,000,000 (Josephus) Jews of Jerusalem, all of them either died of starvation, were killed or were sold into slavery. Roman rule was again challenged during the Bar Kokhba revolt, beginning in 132 CE and suppressed by the Romans in 135 CE. More recent research indicates that the Romans had founded Aelia Capitolina before the outbreak of the revolt, and found no evidence for Bar Kokhba ever managing to hold the city.

Following the Bar Kokhba revolt, Emperor Hadrian combined Iudaea Province with neighbouring provinces under the new name of Syria Palaestina, replacing the name of Judea. The city was renamed Aelia Capitolina, and rebuilt it in the style of a typical Roman town. Jews were prohibited from entering the city on pain of death, except for one day each year, during the holiday of Tisha B'Av. Taken together, these measures (which also affected Jewish Christians) essentially "secularized" the city. The ban was maintained until the 7th century, though Christians would soon be granted an exemption: during the 4th century, the Roman emperor Constantine I ordered the construction of Christian holy sites in the city, including the Church of the Holy Sepulchre. Burial remains from the Byzantine period are exclusively Christian, suggesting that the population of Jerusalem in Byzantine times probably consisted only of Christians.

In the 5th century, the eastern continuation of the Roman Empire, ruled from the recently renamed Constantinople, maintained control of the city. Within the span of a few decades, Jerusalem shifted from Byzantine to Persian rule, then back to Roman-Byzantine dominion. Following Sassanid Khosrau II's early 7th century push through Syria, his generals Shahrbaraz and Shahin attacked Jerusalem aided by the Jews of Palaestina Prima, who had risen up against the Byzantines.

In the Siege of Jerusalem of 614, after 21 days of relentless siege warfare, Jerusalem was captured. Byzantine chronicles relate that the Sassanids and Jews slaughtered tens of thousands of Christians in the city, many at the Mamilla Pool,Jerusalem blessed, Jerusalem cursed: Jews, Christians, and Muslims in the Holy City from David's time to our own. By Thomas A. Idinopulos, I.R. Dee, 1991, p. 152 and destroyed their monuments and churches, including the Church of the Holy Sepulchre. This episode has been the subject of much debate between historians. The conquered city would remain in Sassanid hands for some fifteen years until the Byzantine emperor Heraclius reconquered it in 629.

Jerusalem reached a peak in size and population at the end of the Second Temple Period, when the city covered  and had a population of 200,000.

Early Muslim period

Byzantine Jerusalem was conquered by the Arab armies of Umar ibn al-Khattab in 638 CE. Among the first Muslims, it was referred to as Madinat bayt al-Maqdis ("City of the Temple"), a name restricted to the Temple Mount. The rest of the city "was called Iliya, reflecting the Roman name given the city following the destruction of 70 CE: Aelia Capitolina". Later the Temple Mount became known as al-Haram al-Sharif, "The Noble Sanctuary", while the city around it became known as Bayt al-Maqdis, and later still, al-Quds al-Sharif "The Holy, Noble". The Islamization of Jerusalem began in the first year A.H. (623 CE), when Muslims were instructed to face the city while performing their daily prostrations and, according to Muslim religious tradition, Muhammad's night journey and ascension to heaven took place. After 13 years, the direction of prayer was changed to Mecca. In 638 CE the Islamic Caliphate extended its dominion to Jerusalem. With the Arab conquest, Jews were allowed back into the city. The Rashidun caliph Umar ibn al-Khattab signed a treaty with Christian Patriarch of Jerusalem Sophronius, assuring him that Jerusalem's Christian holy places and population would be protected under Muslim rule. Christian-Arab tradition records that, when led to pray at the Church of the Holy Sepulchre, one of the holiest sites for Christians, the caliph Umar refused to pray in the church so that Muslims would not request conversion of the church to a mosque. He prayed outside the church, where the Mosque of Umar (Omar) stands to this day, opposite the entrance to the Church of the Holy Sepulchre. According to the Gaullic bishop Arculf, who lived in Jerusalem from 679 to 688, the Mosque of Umar was a rectangular wooden structure built over ruins which could accommodate 3,000 worshipers.

When the Arab armies under Umar went to Bayt Al-Maqdes in 637 CE, they searched for the site of al-masjid al-aqsa, "the farthest place of prayer/mosque", that was mentioned in the Quran and Hadith according to Islamic beliefs. Contemporary Arabic and Hebrew sources say the site was full of rubbish, and that Arabs and Jews cleaned it. The Umayyad caliph Abd al-Malik commissioned the construction of a shrine on the Temple Mount, now known as the Dome of the Rock, in the late 7th century. Two of the city's most-distinguished Arab citizens of the 10th-century were Al-Muqaddasi, the geographer, and Al-Tamimi, the physician. Al-Muqaddasi writes that Abd al-Malik built the edifice on the Temple Mount in order to compete in grandeur with Jerusalem's monumental churches.

 Over the next four hundred years, Jerusalem's prominence diminished as Arab powers in the region vied for control of the city. Jerusalem was captured in 1073 by the Seljuk Turkish commander Atsız. After Atsız was killed, the Seljuk prince Tutush I granted the city to Artuk Bey, another Seljuk commander. After Artuk's death in 1091 his sons Sökmen and Ilghazi governed in the city up to 1098 when the Fatimids recaptured the city.

A messianic Karaite movement to gather in Jerusalem took place at the turn of the millennium, leading to a "Golden Age" of Karaite scholarship there, which was only terminated by the Crusades.

Crusader/Ayyubid period

In 1099, the Fatimid ruler expelled the native Christian population before Jerusalem was besieged by the soldiers of the First Crusade. After taking the solidly defended city by assault, the Crusaders massacred most of its Muslim and Jewish inhabitants, and made it the capital of their Kingdom of Jerusalem. The city, which had been virtually emptied, was recolonized by a variegated inflow of Greeks, Bulgarians, Hungarians, Georgians, Armenians, Syrians, Egyptians, Nestorians, Maronites, Jacobite Miaphysites, Copts and others, to block the return of the surviving Muslims and Jews. The north-eastern quarter was repopulated with Eastern Christians from the Transjordan. As a result, by 1099 Jerusalem's population had climbed back to some 30,000.

In 1187, the city was wrested from the Crusaders by Saladin who permitted Jews and Muslims to return and settle in the city. Under the terms of surrender, once ransomed, 60,000 Franks were expelled. The Eastern Christian populace was permitted to stay. Under the Ayyubid dynasty of Saladin, a period of huge investment began in the construction of houses, markets, public baths, and pilgrim hostels as well as the establishment of religious endowments. However, for most of the 13th century, Jerusalem declined to the status of a village due to city's fall of strategic value and Ayyubid internecine struggles.

From 1229 to 1244, Jerusalem peacefully reverted to Christian control as a result of a 1229 treaty agreed between the crusading Holy Roman Emperor Frederick II and al-Kamil, the Ayyubid sultan of Egypt, that ended the Sixth Crusade. The Ayyubids retained control of the Muslim holy places, and Arab sources suggest that Frederick was not permitted to restore Jerusalem's fortifications.

In 1244, Jerusalem was sacked by the Khwarezmian Tatars, who decimated the city's Christian population and drove out the Jews. The Khwarezmian Tatars were driven out by the Ayyubids in 1247.

Mamluk period
From 1260 to 1516/17, Jerusalem was ruled by the Mamluks. In the wider region and until around 1300, many clashes occurred between the Mamluks on one side, and the crusaders and the Mongols, on the other side. The area also suffered from many earthquakes and black plague. When Nachmanides visited in 1267 he found only two Jewish families, in a population of 2,000, 300 of whom were Christians, in the city. The well-known and far-traveled lexicographer Fairuzabadi (1329–1414) spent ten years in Jerusalem.

The 13th to 15th centuries was a period of frequent building activity in the city, as evidenced by the 90 remaining structures from this time. The city was also a significant site of Mamluk architectural patronage. The types of structures built included madrasas, libraries, hospitals, caravanserais, fountains (or sabils), and public baths. Much of the building activity was concentrated around the edges of the Temple Mount or Haram al-Sharif. Old gates to the Haram lost importance and new gates were built, while significant parts of the northern and western porticoes along the edge of the Temple Mount plaza were built or rebuilt in this period. Tankiz, the Mamluk amir in charge of Syria during the reign of al-Nasir Muhammad, built a new market called Suq al-Qattatin (Cotton Market) in 1336–7, along with the gate known as Bab al-Qattanin (Cotton Gate), which gave access to the Temple Mount from this market. The late Mamluk sultan al-Ashraf Qaytbay also took interest in the city. He commissioned the building of the Madrasa al-Ashrafiyya, completed in 1482, and the nearby Sabil of Qaytbay, built shortly after in 1482; both were located on the Temple Mount. Qaytbay's monuments were the last major Mamluk constructions in the city.

Ottoman period (16th–19th centuries)
In 1517, Jerusalem and its environs fell to the Ottoman Turks, who generally remained in control until 1917. Jerusalem enjoyed a prosperous period of renewal and peace under Suleiman the Magnificent—including the rebuilding of magnificent walls around the Old City. Throughout much of Ottoman rule, Jerusalem remained a provincial, if religiously important centre, and did not straddle the main trade route between Damascus and Cairo. The English reference book Modern history or the present state of all nations, written in 1744, stated that "Jerusalem is still reckoned the capital city of Palestine, though much fallen from its ancient grandeaur".The Ottomans brought many innovations: modern postal systems run by the various consulates and regular stagecoach and carriage services were among the first signs of modernization in the city. In the mid 19th century, the Ottomans constructed the first paved road from Jaffa to Jerusalem, and by 1892 the railroad had reached the city.

With the annexation of Jerusalem by Muhammad Ali of Egypt in 1831, foreign missions and consulates began to establish a foothold in the city. In 1836, Ibrahim Pasha allowed Jerusalem's Jewish residents to restore four major synagogues, among them the Hurva. In the countrywide Peasants' Revolt, Qasim al-Ahmad led his forces from Nablus and attacked Jerusalem, aided by the Abu Ghosh clan, and entered the city on 31 May 1834. The Christians and Jews of Jerusalem were subjected to attacks. Ibrahim's Egyptian army routed Qasim's forces in Jerusalem the following month.

Ottoman rule was reinstated in 1840, but many Egyptian Muslims remained in Jerusalem and Jews from Algiers and North Africa began to settle in the city in growing numbers. In the 1840s and 1850s, the international powers began a tug-of-war in Palestine as they sought to extend their protection over the region's religious minorities, a struggle carried out mainly through consular representatives in Jerusalem. According to the Prussian consul, the population in 1845 was 16,410, with 7,120 Jews, 5,000 Muslims, 3,390 Christians, 800 Turkish soldiers and 100 Europeans. The volume of Christian pilgrims increased under the Ottomans, doubling the city's population around Easter time.In the 1860s, new neighbourhoods began to develop outside the Old City walls to house pilgrims and relieve the intense overcrowding and poor sanitation inside the city. The Russian Compound and Mishkenot Sha'ananim were founded in 1860, followed by many others that included Mahane Israel (1868), Nahalat Shiv'a (1869), German Colony (1872), Beit David (1873), Mea Shearim (1874), Shimon HaZadiq (1876), Beit Ya'aqov (1877), Abu Tor (1880s), American-Swedish Colony (1882), Yemin Moshe (1891), and Mamilla, Wadi al-Joz around the turn of the century. In 1867 an American Missionary reports an estimated population of Jerusalem of 'above' 15,000, with 4,000 to 5,000 Jews and 6,000 Muslims. Every year there were 5,000 to 6,000 Russian Christian Pilgrims. In 1872 Jerusalem became the centre of a special administrative district, independent of the Syria Vilayet and under the direct authority of Istanbul called the Mutasarrifate of Jerusalem.

The great number of Christian orphans resulting from the 1860 civil war in Mount Lebanon and the Damascus massacre led in the same year to the opening of the German Protestant Syrian Orphanage, better known as the Schneller Orphanage after its founder. Until the 1880s there were no formal Jewish orphanages in Jerusalem, as families generally took care of each other. In 1881 the Diskin Orphanage was founded in Jerusalem with the arrival of Jewish children orphaned by a Russian pogrom. Other orphanages founded in Jerusalem at the beginning of the 20th century were Zion Blumenthal Orphanage (1900) and General Israel Orphan's Home for Girls (1902).

British Mandate (1917–1948)

In 1917 after the Battle of Jerusalem, the British Army, led by General Edmund Allenby, captured the city. In 1922, the League of Nations at the Conference of Lausanne entrusted the United Kingdom to administer Palestine, neighbouring Transjordan, and Iraq beyond it.

The British had to deal with a conflicting demand that was rooted in Ottoman rule. Agreements for the supply of water, electricity, and the construction of a tramway system—all under concessions granted by the Ottoman authorities—had been signed by the city of Jerusalem and a Greek citizen, Euripides Mavromatis, on 27 January 1914. Work under these concessions had not begun and, by the end of the war the British occupying forces refused to recognize their validity. Mavromatis claimed that his concessions overlapped with the Auja Concession that the government had awarded to Rutenberg in 1921 and that he had been deprived of his legal rights. The Mavromatis concession, in effect despite earlier British attempts to abolish it, covered Jerusalem and other localities (e.g., Bethlehem) within a radius of  around the Church of the Holy Sepulchre.

From 1922 to 1948 the total population of the city rose from 52,000 to 165,000, comprising two-thirds Jews and one-third Arabs (Muslims and Christians). Relations between Arab Christians and Muslims and the growing Jewish population in Jerusalem deteriorated, resulting in recurring unrest. In Jerusalem, in particular, Arab riots occurred in 1920 and in 1929. Under the British, new garden suburbs were built in the western and northern parts of the city and institutions of higher learning such as the Hebrew University were founded.

Divided city: Jordanian and Israeli rule (1948–1967)

As the British Mandate for Palestine was expiring, the 1947 UN Partition Plan recommended "the creation of a special international regime in the City of Jerusalem, constituting it as a corpus separatum under the administration of the UN." The international regime (which also included the city of Bethlehem) was to remain in force for a period of ten years, whereupon a referendum was to be held in which the residents were to decide the future regime of their city. However, this plan was not implemented, as the 1948 war erupted, while the British withdrew from Palestine and Israel declared its independence.

In contradiction to the Partition Plan, which envisioned a city separated from the Arab state and the Jewish state, Israel took control of the area which later would become West Jerusalem, along with major parts of the Arab territory allotted to the future Arab State; Jordan took control of East Jerusalem, along with the West Bank. The war led to displacement of Arab and Jewish populations in the city. The 1,500 residents of the Jewish Quarter of the Old City were expelled and a few hundred taken prisoner when the Arab Legion captured the quarter on 28 May.Mordechai Weingarten Arab residents of Katamon, Talbiya, and the German Colony were driven from their homes. By the time of the armistice that ended active fighting, Israel had control of 12 of Jerusalem's 15 Arab residential quarters. An estimated minimum of 30,000 people had become refugees.Asali, K. J. (1989) Jerusalem in History. Scorpion Publishing. . p. 259. Estimate of number of refugees (Michael C. Hudson).

The war of 1948 resulted in the division of Jerusalem, so that the old walled city lay entirely on the Jordanian side of the line. A no-man's land between East and West Jerusalem came into being in November 1948: Moshe Dayan, commander of the Israeli forces in Jerusalem, met with his Jordanian counterpart Abdullah el-Tell in a deserted house in Jerusalem's Musrara neighbourhood and marked out their respective positions: Israel's position in red and Jordan's in green. This rough map, which was not meant as an official one, became the final line in the 1949 Armistice Agreements, which divided the city and left Mount Scopus as an Israeli exclave inside East Jerusalem. Barbed wire and concrete barriers ran down the centre of the city, passing close by Jaffa Gate on the western side of the old walled city, and a crossing point was established at Mandelbaum Gate slightly to the north of the old walled city. Military skirmishes frequently threatened the ceasefire.

After the establishment of the state of Israel, Jerusalem was declared its capital city. Jordan formally annexed East Jerusalem in 1950, subjecting it to Jordanian law, and in 1953 declared it the "second capital" of Jordan. Only the United Kingdom and Pakistan formally recognized such annexation, which, in regard to Jerusalem, was on a de facto basis. Some scholars argue that the view that Pakistan recognized Jordan's annexation is dubious.

After 1948, since the old walled city in its entirety was to the east of the armistice line, Jordan was able to take control of all the holy places therein. While Muslim holy sites were maintained and renovated, contrary to the terms of the armistice agreement, Jews were denied access to Jewish holy sites, many of which were destroyed or desecrated. Jordan allowed only very limited access to Christian holy sites, and restrictions were imposed on the Christian population that led many to leave the city. Of the 58 synagogues in the Old City, half were either razed or converted to stables and hen-houses over the course of the next 19 years, including the Hurva and the Tiferet Yisrael Synagogue. The 3,000-year-old Mount of Olives Jewish Cemetery was desecrated, with gravestones used to build roads, latrines and Jordanian army fortifications. 38,000 graves in the Jewish Cemetery were destroyed, and Jews were forbidden from being buried there. The Western Wall was transformed into an exclusively Muslim holy site associated with al-Buraq. Israeli authorities neglected to protect the tombs in the Muslim Mamilla Cemetery in West Jerusalem, which contains the remains of figures from the early Islamic period, facilitating the creation of a parking lot and public lavatories in 1964. Many other historic and religiously significant buildings were demolished and replaced by modern structures during the Jordanian occupation. During this period, the Dome of the Rock and the Al-Aqsa Mosque underwent major renovations.

During the 1948 war, the Jewish residents of Eastern Jerusalem were expelled by Jordan's Arab Legion. Jordan allowed Arab Palestinian refugees from the war to settle in the vacated Jewish Quarter, which became known as Harat al-Sharaf. In 1966 the Jordanian authorities relocated 500 of them to the Shua'fat refugee camp as part of plans to turn the Jewish quarter into a public park.

Israeli rule (1967–present)

In 1967, despite Israeli pleas that Jordan remain neutral during the Six-Day War, Jordan, which had concluded a defense agreement with Egypt on 30 May 1967, attacked Israeli-held West Jerusalem on the war's second day. After hand-to-hand fighting between Israeli and Jordanian soldiers on the Temple Mount, the Israel Defense Forces captured East Jerusalem, along with the entire West Bank. On 27 June 1967, three weeks after the war ended, in the reunification of Jerusalem, Israel extended its law and jurisdiction to East Jerusalem, including the city's Christian and Muslim holy sites, along with some nearby West Bank territory which comprised 28 Palestinian villages, incorporating it into the Jerusalem Municipality, although it carefully avoided using the term "annexation". On 10 July, Foreign Minister Abba Eban explained to the UN Secretary General: "The term 'annexation' which was used by supporters of the vote is not accurate. The steps that were taken [by Israel] relate to the integration of Jerusalem in administrative and municipal areas, and served as a legal basis for the protection of the holy places of Jerusalem." Israel conducted a census of Arab residents in the areas annexed. Residents were given permanent residency status and the option of applying for Israeli citizenship. Since 1967, new Jewish residential areas have mushroomed in the eastern sector, while no new Palestinian neighbourhoods have been created.

Jewish and Christian access to the holy sites inside the old walled city was restored. Israel left the Temple Mount under the jurisdiction of an Islamic waqf, but opened the Western Wall to Jewish access. The Moroccan Quarter, which was located adjacent to the Western Wall, was evacuated and razed to make way for a plaza for those visiting the wall. On 18 April 1968, an expropriation order by the Israeli Ministry of Finance more than doubled the size of the Jewish Quarter, evicting its Arab residents and seizing over 700 buildings of which 105 belonged to Jewish inhabitants prior to the Jordanian occupation of the city. The order designated these areas for public use, but they were intended for Jews alone. The government offered 200 Jordanian dinars to each displaced Arab family.

After the Six-Day War the population of Jerusalem increased by 196%. The Jewish population grew by 155%, while the Arab population grew by 314%. The proportion of the Jewish population fell from 74% in 1967 to 72% in 1980, to 68% in 2000, and to 64% in 2010. Israeli Agriculture Minister Ariel Sharon proposed building a ring of Jewish neighbourhoods around the city's eastern edges. The plan was intended to make East Jerusalem more Jewish and prevent it from becoming part of an urban Palestinian bloc stretching from Bethlehem to Ramallah. On 2 October 1977, the Israeli cabinet approved the plan, and seven neighbourhoods were subsequently built on the city's eastern edges. They became known as the Ring Neighbourhoods. Other Jewish neighbourhoods were built within East Jerusalem, and Israeli Jews also settled in Arab neighbourhoods.

The annexation of East Jerusalem was met with international criticism. The Israeli Foreign Ministry disputes that the annexation of Jerusalem was a violation of international law.The Status of Jerusalem – Israeli Foreign Ministry website, 14 March 1999 The final status of Jerusalem has been one of the most important areas of discord between Palestinian and Israeli negotiators for peace. Areas of discord have included whether the Palestinian flag can be raised over areas of Palestinian custodianship and the specificity of Israeli and Palestinian territorial borders.

Political status

From 1923 until 1948, Jerusalem served as the administrative capital of Mandatory Palestine.

From 1949 until 1967, West Jerusalem served as Israel's capital, but was not recognized as such internationally because UN General Assembly Resolution 194 envisaged Jerusalem as an international city. As a result of the Six-Day War in 1967, the whole of Jerusalem came under Israeli control. On 27 June 1967, the government of Levi Eshkol extended Israeli law and jurisdiction to East Jerusalem, but agreed that administration of the Temple Mount compound would be maintained by the Jordanian waqf, under the Jordanian Ministry of Religious Endowments.

In 1988, Israel ordered the closure of Orient House, home of the Arab Studies Society, but also the headquarters of the Palestine Liberation Organization, for security reasons. The building reopened in 1992 as a Palestinian guesthouse. The Oslo Accords stated that the final status of Jerusalem would be determined by negotiations with the Palestinian Authority. The accords banned any official Palestinian presence in the city until a final peace agreement, but provided for the opening of a Palestinian trade office in East Jerusalem. The Palestinian Authority regards East Jerusalem as the capital of a future Palestinian state. President Mahmoud Abbas has said that any agreement that did not include East Jerusalem as the capital of Palestine would be unacceptable. Israeli Prime Minister Benjamin Netanyahu has similarly stated that Jerusalem would remain the undivided capital of Israel. Due to its proximity to the city, especially the Temple Mount, Abu Dis, a Palestinian suburb of Jerusalem, has been proposed as the future capital of a Palestinian state by Israel. Israel has not incorporated Abu Dis within its security wall around Jerusalem. The Palestinian Authority has built a possible future parliament building for the Palestinian Legislative Council in the town, and its Jerusalem Affairs Offices are all located in Abu Dis.

International status
While the international community regards East Jerusalem, including the entire Old City, as part of the occupied Palestinian territories, neither part, West or East Jerusalem, is recognized as part of the territory of Israel or the State of Palestine.Jerusalem: Opposition to mooted Trump Israel announcement grows"Israeli sovereignty over Jerusalem has never been recognised internationally"The Jerusalem Law states that "Jerusalem, complete and united, is the capital of Israel" and the city serves as the seat of the government, home to the President's residence, government offices, supreme court, and parliament. United Nations Security Council Resolution 478 (20 August 1980; 14–0, U.S. abstaining) declared the Jerusalem Law "null and void" and called on member states to withdraw their diplomatic missions from Jerusalem (see ). See Status of Jerusalem for more information. Under the United Nations Partition Plan for Palestine adopted by the General Assembly of the United Nations in 1947, Jerusalem was envisaged to become a corpus separatum administered by the United Nations. In the war of 1948, the western part of the city was occupied by forces of the nascent state of Israel, while the eastern part was occupied by Jordan. The international community largely considers the legal status of Jerusalem to derive from the partition plan, and correspondingly refuses to recognize Israeli sovereignty over the city.

Status under Israeli rule
Following the 1967 Six-Day War, Israel extended its jurisdiction and administration over East Jerusalem, establishing new municipal borders.

In 2010, Israel approved legislation giving Jerusalem the highest national priority status in Israel. The law prioritized construction throughout the city, and offered grants and tax benefits to residents to make housing, infrastructure, education, employment, business, tourism, and cultural events more affordable. Communications Minister Moshe Kahlon said that the bill sent "a clear, unequivocal political message that Jerusalem will not be divided", and that "all those within the Palestinian and international community who expect the current Israeli government to accept any demands regarding Israel's sovereignty over its capital are mistaken and misleading".

The status of the city, and especially its holy places, remains a core issue in the Israeli–Palestinian conflict. The Israeli government has approved building plans in the Muslim Quarter of the Old City in order to expand the Jewish presence in East Jerusalem, while some Islamic leaders have made claims that Jews have no historical connection to Jerusalem, alleging that the 2,500-year-old Western Wall was constructed as part of a mosque. Palestinians regard Jerusalem as the capital of the State of Palestine, and the city's borders have been the subject of bilateral talks. A team of experts assembled by the then Israeli Prime Minister Ehud Barak in 2000 concluded that the city must be divided, since Israel had failed to achieve any of its national aims there. However, Israeli Prime Minister Benjamin Netanyahu said in 2014 that "Jerusalem will never be divided". A poll conducted in June 2013 found that 74% of Israeli Jews reject the idea of a Palestinian capital in any portion of Jerusalem, though 72% of the public regarded it as a divided city. A poll conducted by Palestinian Centre for Public Opinion and American Pechter Middle East Polls for the Council on Foreign Relations, among East Jerusalem Arab residents in 2011 revealed that 39% of East Jerusalem Arab residents would prefer Israeli citizenship contrary to 31% who opted for Palestinian citizenship. According to the poll, 40% of Palestinian residents would prefer to leave their neighbourhoods if they would be placed under Palestinian rule.

Jerusalem as capital of Israel

On 5 December 1949, Israel's first Prime Minister, David Ben-Gurion, proclaimed Jerusalem as Israel's "eternal" and "sacred" capital, and eight days later specified that only the war had "compelled" the Israeli leadership "to establish the seat of Government in Tel Aviv", while "for the State of Israel there has always been and always will be one capital only – Jerusalem the Eternal", and that after the war, efforts had been ongoing for creating the conditions for "the Knesset... returning to Jerusalem." This indeed took place, and since the beginning of 1950 all branches of the Israeli government—legislative, judicial, and executive—have resided there, except for the Ministry of Defense, which is located at HaKirya in Tel Aviv. At the time of Ben Gurion's proclamations and the ensuing Knesset vote of 24 January 1950, Jerusalem was divided between Israel and Jordan, and thus the proclamation only applied to West Jerusalem.

In July 1980, Israel passed the Jerusalem Law as Basic Law. The law declared Jerusalem the "complete and united" capital of Israel. The Jerusalem Law was condemned by the international community, which did not recognize Jerusalem as the capital of Israel. The United Nations Security Council passed Resolution 478 on 20 August 1980, which declared that the Jerusalem Law is "a violation of international law", is "null and void and must be rescinded forthwith". Member states were called upon to withdraw their diplomatic representation from Jerusalem. Following the resolution, 22 of the 24 countries that previously had their embassy in (West) Jerusalem relocated them in Tel Aviv, where many embassies already resided prior to Resolution 478. Costa Rica and El Salvador followed in 2006. There are two embassies—United States and Guatemala—and two consulates located within the city limits of Jerusalem, and two Latin American states maintain embassies in the Jerusalem District town of Mevaseret Zion (Bolivia and Paraguay). There are a number of consulates-general located in Jerusalem, which work primarily either with Israel, or the Palestinian authorities.

In 1995, the United States Congress passed the Jerusalem Embassy Act, which required, subject to conditions, that its embassy be moved from Tel Aviv to Jerusalem. On 6 December 2017 U.S. President Donald Trump officially recognized Jerusalem as Israel's capital and announced his intention to move the American embassy to Jerusalem, reversing decades of United States policy on the issue. The move was criticized by many nations. A resolution condemning the US decision was supported by all the 14 other members of the UN Security Council, but was vetoed by the US on 18 December 2017, and a subsequent resolution condemning the US decision was passed in the United Nations General Assembly. On 14 May 2018, the United States officially opened its embassy in Jerusalem, transforming its Tel Aviv location into a consulate. Due to the general lack of international recognition of Jerusalem as Israel's capital, some non-Israeli media outlets use Tel Aviv as a metonym for Israel.Times Online Style Guide – J "Jerusalem must not be used as a metonym or variant for Israel. It is not internationally recognised as the Israeli capital, and its status is one of the central controversies in the Middle East."

In April 2017, the Russian Foreign Ministry announced it viewed Western Jerusalem as Israel's capital in the context of UN-approved principles which include the status of East Jerusalem as the capital of the future Palestinian state. On , Australia officially recognized West Jerusalem as Israel's capital, but said their embassy in Tel Aviv would stay until a two-state resolution was settled. The decision was reversed in October 2022.

Government precinct and national institutions
The Kiryat HaLeom (national precinct) project is intended to house most government agencies and national cultural institutions. They are located in the Kiryat HaMemshala (government complex) in the Givat Ram neighbourhood. Some government buildings are located in Kiryat Menachem Begin. The city is home to the Knesset, the Supreme Court, the Bank of Israel, the National Headquarters of the Israel Police, the official residences of the President and Prime Minister, the Cabinet, and all ministries except for the Ministry of Defense (which is located in central Tel Aviv's HaKirya district) and the Ministry of Agriculture and Rural Development (which is located in Rishon LeZion, in the wider Tel Aviv metropolitan area, near Beit Dagan).

Jerusalem as capital of Palestine

The Palestinian National Authority views East Jerusalem as occupied territory according to United Nations Security Council Resolution 242. The Palestinian Authority claims Jerusalem, including the Haram al-Sharif, as the capital of the State of Palestine, The PLO claims that West Jerusalem is also subject to permanent status negotiations. However, it has stated that it would be willing to consider alternative solutions, such as making Jerusalem an open city.

The PLO's position is that East Jerusalem, as defined by the pre-1967 municipal boundaries, shall be the capital of Palestine and West Jerusalem the capital of Israel, with each state enjoying full sovereignty over its respective part of the city and with its own municipality. A joint development council would be responsible for coordinated development.

Some states, such as Russia and China, recognize the Palestinian state with East Jerusalem as its capital. United Nations General Assembly Resolution 58/292 affirmed that the Palestinian people have the right to sovereignty over East Jerusalem.

Municipal administration

The Jerusalem City Council is a body of 31 elected members headed by the mayor, who serves a five-year term and appoints eight deputies. The former mayor of Jerusalem, Uri Lupolianski, was elected in 2003. In the November 2008 city elections, Nir Barkat was elected. In November 2018, Moshe Lion was elected mayor.

Apart from the mayor and his deputies, City Council members receive no salaries and work on a voluntary basis. The longest-serving Jerusalem mayor was Teddy Kollek, who spent 28 years—six consecutive terms—in office. Most of the meetings of the Jerusalem City Council are private, but each month, it holds a session that is open to the public. Within the city council, religious political parties form an especially powerful faction, accounting for the majority of its seats. The headquarters of the Jerusalem Municipality and the mayor's office are at Safra Square (Kikar Safra) on Jaffa Road. The municipal complex, comprising two modern buildings and ten renovated historic buildings surrounding a large plaza, opened in 1993 when it moved from the old town hall building built by the Mandate authorities. The city falls under the Jerusalem District, with Jerusalem as the district's capital. 37% of the population is Palestinian, but in 2014 not more than 10% of tax revenues were allocated for them. In East Jerusalem, 52% of the land was excluded from development, 35% designated for Jewish settlements, and 13% for Palestinian use, almost all of which was already built on.

Geography

Jerusalem is situated on the southern spur of a plateau in the Judaean Mountains, which include the Mount of Olives (East) and Mount Scopus (North East). The whole of Jerusalem is surrounded by valleys and dry riverbeds (wadis). The Kidron, Hinnom, and Tyropoeon Valleys intersect in an area just south of the Old City of Jerusalem. The Kidron Valley runs to the east of the Old City and separates the Mount of Olives from the city proper. Along the southern side of old Jerusalem is the Valley of Hinnom, a steep ravine associated in biblical eschatology with the concept of Gehenna or Hell. The Tyropoeon Valley commenced in the northwest near the Damascus Gate, ran south-southeasterly through the centre of the Old City down to the Pool of Siloam, and divided the lower part into two hills, the Temple Mount to the east, and the rest of the city to the west (the lower and the upper cities described by Josephus). Today, this valley is hidden by debris that has accumulated over the centuries. In biblical times, Jerusalem was surrounded by forests of almond, olive and pine trees. Over centuries of warfare and neglect, these forests were destroyed. Farmers in the Jerusalem region thus built stone terraces along the slopes to hold back the soil, a feature still very much in evidence in the Jerusalem landscape.

Water supply has always been a major problem in Jerusalem, as attested to by the intricate network of ancient aqueducts, tunnels, pools and cisterns found in the city.

Neighbouring cities and towns include Bethlehem and Beit Jala to the south, Abu Dis and Ma'ale Adumim to the east, Mevaseret Zion to the west, and Ramallah and Giv'at Ze'ev to the north. (See map 9 for Jerusalem)

Mount Herzl, at the western side of the city near the Jerusalem Forest, serves as the national cemetery of Israel.

Climate

The city is characterized by a hot-summer Mediterranean climate (Köppen: Csa), with hot, dry summers, and mild, wet winters. Snow flurries usually occur once or twice a winter, although the city experiences heavy snowfall every three to four years, on average, with short-lived accumulation.

Snowfall is rare, and large snowfalls are even more rare. A day in Jerusalem has on average, 9.3 sunshine hours. With summers averaging similar temperatures as the coastline, the maritime influence from the Mediterranean Sea is strong, in particular given that Jerusalem is located on a similar latitude as scorching hot deserts not far to its east.

Most of the air pollution in Jerusalem comes from vehicular traffic. Many main streets in Jerusalem were not built to accommodate such a large volume of traffic, leading to traffic congestion and more carbon monoxide released into the air. Industrial pollution inside the city is sparse, but emissions from factories on the Israeli Mediterranean coast can travel eastward and settle over the city.

Demographics

Demographic history

Jerusalem's population size and composition has shifted many times over its 5,000-year history. Since medieval times, the Old City of Jerusalem has been divided into Jewish, Muslim, Christian, and Armenian quarters.

Most population data before 1905 is based on estimates, often from foreign travellers or organisations, since previous census data usually covered wider areas such as the Jerusalem District. These estimates suggest that since the end of the Crusades, Muslims formed the largest group in Jerusalem until the mid-nineteenth century.

Between 1838 and 1876, a number of estimates exist which conflict as to whether Jews or Muslims were the largest group during this period, and between 1882 and 1922 estimates conflict as to exactly when Jews became an absolute majority of the population.

Current demographics
In December 2007, Jerusalem had a population of 747,600—63.7% were Jewish, 33.1% Muslim, and 2% Christian. 

According to a study published in 2000, the percentage of Jews in the city's population had been decreasing; this was attributed to a higher Muslim birth rate, and Jewish residents leaving. The study also found that about nine percent of the Old City's 32,488 people were Jews. Of the Jewish population, 200,000 live in East Jerusalem settlements which are considered illegal under international law.

In 2005, 2,850 new immigrants settled in Jerusalem, mostly from the United States, France and the former Soviet Union. In terms of the local population, the number of outgoing residents exceeds the number of incoming residents. In 2005, 16,000 left Jerusalem and only 10,000 moved in. Nevertheless, the population of Jerusalem continues to rise due to the high birth rate, especially in the Haredi Jewish and Arab communities. Consequently, the total fertility rate in Jerusalem (4.02) is higher than in Tel Aviv (1.98) and well above the national average of 2.90. The average size of Jerusalem's 180,000 households is 3.8 people.

In 2005, the total population grew by 13,000 (1.8%)—similar to the Israeli national average, but the religious and ethnic composition is shifting. While 31% of the Jewish population is made up of children below the age fifteen, the figure for the Arab population is 42%.

In 1967, Jews accounted for 74 percent of the population, while the figure for 2006 is down nine percent. Possible factors are the high cost of housing, fewer job opportunities and the increasingly religious character of the city, although proportionally, young Haredim are leaving in higher numbers. The percentage of secular Jews, or those who 'wear their faith lightly' is dropping, with some 20,000 leaving the city over the past seven years (2012). They now number 31% of the population, the same percentage as the rising Haredi population.

In 2010, 61% of all Jewish children in Jerusalem studied in Haredi (Ultra-Ortodox) schools. This correlates with the high number of children in Haredi families.

While some secular Jews leave Jerusalem for its relative lack of development and religious and political tensions, Jerusalem-born Palestinians cannot leave Jerusalem, or they lose their right to live in the city. Palestinians with a "Jerusalem resident status" are entitled to the subsidized healthcare and social security benefits Israel provides to its citizens, and have the right to vote in municipal elections, but not to be voted in municipal elections, or to vote in national elections. Arabs in Jerusalem can send their children to Israeli-run schools, although not every neighbourhood has one, and universities. Israeli doctors and highly regarded hospitals such as Hadassah Medical Centre are available to residents.

Demographics and the Jewish-Arab population divide play a major role in the dispute over Jerusalem. In 1998, the Jerusalem Development Authority expanded city limits to the west to include more areas heavily populated with Jews.

Within the past few years, there has been a steady increase in the Jewish birthrate and a steady decrease in the Arab birthrate. In May 2012, it was reported that the Jewish birthrate had overtaken the Arab birthrate. The city's birthrate stands about 4.2 children per Jewish family and 3.9 children per Arab family. In addition, increasing numbers of Jewish immigrants chose to settle in Jerusalem. In the last few years, thousands of Palestinians have moved to previously fully Jewish neighbourhoods of East Jerusalem, built after the 1967 Six-Day War. In 2007, 1,300 Palestinians lived in the previously exclusively Jewish neighbourhood of Pisgat Ze'ev and constituted three percent of the population in Neve Ya'akov. In the French Hill neighbourhood, Palestinians today constitute one-sixth of the overall population.At the end of 2008, the population of East Jerusalem was 456,300, comprising 60% of Jerusalem's residents. Of these, 195,500 (43%) were Jews, (comprising 40% of the Jewish population of Jerusalem as a whole), and 260,800 (57%) were Muslim (comprising 98% of the Muslim population of Jerusalem). In 2008, the Palestinian Central Bureau of Statistics reported the number of Palestinians living in East Jerusalem was 208,000 according to a recently completed census.

Jerusalem's Jewish population is overwhelmingly religious. Only 18% of Jewish residents are secular. In addition, Haredi Jews comprise 35% of the city's adult Jewish population. In a phenomenon seen rarely around the world, the percentage of Jewish women who work, 81%, exceeds the percentage of Jewish men who work, 70%.

Jerusalem had a population of 804,400 in 2011, of which Jews comprised 499,400 (62.1%), Muslims 281,100 (34.9%), Christians 14,700 (1.8%), and 9,000 (1.1%) were not classified by religion.

Jerusalem had a population of 882,700 in 2016, of which Jews comprised 536,600 (60.8%), Muslims 319,800 (36.2%), Christians 15,800 (1.8%), and 10,300 unclassified (1.2%).

Jerusalem had a population of 951,100 in 2020, of which Jews comprised 570,100 (59.9%), Muslims 353.800 (37.2%), Christians 16.300 (1.7%), and 10,800 unclassified (1.1%).

According to Peace Now, approvals for building in Israeli settlements in East Jerusalem have expanded by 60% under Donald Trump's term as U.S. president. Since 1991, Palestinians, who make up the majority of the residents in East Jerusalem, have only received 30% of the building permits.

Urban planning issues
Critics of efforts to promote a Jewish majority in Jerusalem say that government planning policies are motivated by demographic considerations and seek to limit Arab construction while promoting Jewish construction. According to a World Bank report, the number of recorded building violations between 1996 and 2000 was four and half times higher in Jewish neighbourhoods but four times fewer demolition orders were issued in West Jerusalem than in East Jerusalem; Arabs in Jerusalem were less likely to receive construction permits than Jews, and "the authorities are much more likely to take action against Palestinian violators" than Jewish violators of the permit process. In recent years, private Jewish foundations have received permission from the government to develop projects on disputed lands, such as the City of David archaeological site in the 60% Arab neighbourhood of Silwan (adjacent to the Old City), and the Museum of Tolerance on Mamilla Cemetery (adjacent to Zion Square).Esther Zandberg."The architectural conspiracy of silence" ; Haaretz, 24 February 2007

Religious significance
Jerusalem has been sacred to Judaism for roughly 3000 years, to Christianity for around 2000 years, and to Islam for approximately 1400 years. The 2000 Statistical Yearbook of Jerusalem lists 1204 synagogues, 158 churches, and 73 mosques within the city. Despite efforts to maintain peaceful religious coexistence, some sites, such as the Temple Mount, have been a continuous source of friction and controversy.

 Judaism 

Jerusalem has been the holiest city in Judaism and the ancestral and spiritual homeland of the Jewish people since King David proclaimed it his capital in the 10th century BCE. Without counting its other names, Jerusalem appears in the Hebrew Bible 669 times. The first section, the Torah (Pentateuch), only mentions Moriah, but in later parts of the Bible, the city is mentioned explicitly. The Temple Mount, which was the site of Solomon's Temple and the Second Temple, is the holiest site in Judaism and the place Jews turn towards during prayer. The Western Wall, a remnant of the wall surrounding the Second Temple, is the holiest place where Jews are permitted to pray. Synagogues around the world are traditionally built with the Holy Ark facing Jerusalem, and Arks within Jerusalem face the Holy of Holies. As prescribed in the Mishna and codified in the Shulchan Aruch, daily prayers are recited while facing towards Jerusalem and the Temple Mount. Many Jews have "Mizrach" plaques hung on a wall of their homes to indicate the direction of prayer.The Jewish injunction to pray toward Jerusalem comes in the Orach Chayim section of Shulchan Aruch (94:1) – "When one rises to pray anywhere in the Diaspora, he should face towards the Land of Israel, directing himself also toward Jerusalem, the Temple, and the Holy of Holies."

 Christianity 

Jerusalem is generally considered the cradle of Christianity. Christianity reveres Jerusalem for its Old Testament history, and also for its significance in the life of Jesus. According to the New Testament, Jesus was brought to Jerusalem soon after his birth and later in his life cleansed the Second Temple. The Cenacle, believed to be the site of Jesus' Last Supper, is located on Mount Zion in the same building that houses the Tomb of King David. Another prominent Christian site in Jerusalem is Golgotha, the site of the crucifixion. The Gospel of John describes it as being located outside Jerusalem, but recent archaeological evidence suggests Golgotha is a short distance from the Old City walls, within the present-day confines of the city. The land occupied by the Church of the Holy Sepulchre is considered one of the top candidates for Golgotha and thus has been a Christian pilgrimage site for the past 2000 years. The Church of the Holy Sepulchre is generally considered the most important church in Christendom.

 Islam 

Jerusalem is the third-holiest city in Sunni Islam. Islamic tradition holds that for approximately a year, before it was permanently switched to the Kaaba in Mecca, the qibla (direction of prayer) for Muslims was Jerusalem. The city's lasting place in Islam, however, is primarily due to Muhammad's Night Journey (c. 620 CE). Muslims believe that Muhammad was miraculously transported one night from the Great Mosque of Mecca to the Temple Mount in Jerusalem, whereupon he ascended to Heaven to meet previous prophets of Islam. (from an English translation of Sahih Bukhari, Volume IX, Book 93, Number 608) The first verse in the Qur'an's Surat al-Isra notes the destination of Muhammad's journey as al-masjid al-aqṣā ("the farthest place of prayer"). In the earliest days of Islam, this was understood as a reference to a site in the heavens, however, Post-Rashidun Islamic scholars understood it as relating to Jerusalem, and particularly to the site of the former Jewish Temple. The hadith, a collection of the sayings of Muhammad, mentions that the location of the Al-Aqsa Mosque is in Jerusalem. The Al-Aqsa Mosque, originally named  after the wider compound it sits within, was built on the Temple Mount under the Umayyad Caliph Al-Walid several decades after Muhammad's death to commemorate the place from which Muslims believe he had ascended to Heaven.

Economy

Historically, Jerusalem's economy was supported almost exclusively by religious pilgrims, as it was far from the major ports of Jaffa and Gaza. Jerusalem's religious and cultural landmarks today remain the top draw for foreign visitors, with the majority of tourists visiting the Western Wall and the Old City. In 2010, Jerusalem was named the top leisure travel city in Africa and the Middle East by Travel + Leisure magazine.
in 2013, 75% of the 3.5 million tourists to Israel visited Jerusalem.

Since the establishment of the State of Israel, the national government has remained a major player in Jerusalem's economy. The government, centred in Jerusalem, generates a large number of jobs, and offers subsidies and incentives for new business initiatives and start-ups. Although Tel Aviv remains Israel's financial centre, a growing number of high tech companies are moving to Jerusalem, providing 12,000 jobs in 2006. Northern Jerusalem's Har Hotzvim industrial park and the Jerusalem Technology Park in south Jerusalem are home to large Research and Development centres of international tech companies, among them Intel, Cisco Systems, Teva Pharmaceutical Industries, IBM, Mobileye, Johnson & Johnson, Medtronic and more. In April 2015, Time Magazine picked Jerusalem as one of the five emerging tech hubs in the world, proclaiming that "The city has become a flourishing centre for biomed, cleantech, Internet/mobile startups, accelerators, investors and supporting service providers."

Higher than average percentages are employed in education (17.9% vs. 12.7%); health and welfare (12.6% vs. 10.7%); community and social services (6.4% vs. 4.7%); hotels and restaurants (6.1% vs. 4.7%); and public administration (8.2% vs. 4.7%). During the British Mandate, a law was passed requiring all buildings to be constructed of Jerusalem stone in order to preserve the unique historic and aesthetic character of the city. Complementing this building code, which is still in force, is the discouragement of heavy industry in Jerusalem; only about 2.2% of Jerusalem's land is zoned for "industry and infrastructure." By comparison, the percentage of land in Tel Aviv zoned for industry and infrastructure is twice as high, and in Haifa, seven times as high. Only 8.5% of the Jerusalem District work force is employed in the manufacturing sector, which is half the national average (15.8%).

Although many statistics indicate economic growth in the city, since 1967, East Jerusalem has lagged behind the development of West Jerusalem. Nevertheless, the percentage of households with employed persons is higher for Arab households (76.1%) than for Jewish households (66.8%). The unemployment rate in Jerusalem (8.3%) is slightly better than the national average (9.0%), although the civilian labour force accounted for less than half of all persons fifteen years or older—lower in comparison to that of Tel Aviv (58.0%) and Haifa (52.4%). Poverty remains a problem in the city as 37% of the families in Jerusalem lived in 2011 below the poverty line. According to a report by the Association for Civil Rights in Israel (ACRI), 78% of Arabs in Jerusalem lived in poverty in 2012, up from 64% in 2006. While the ACRI attributes the increase to the lack of employment opportunities, infrastructure and a worsening educational system, Ir Amim blames the legal status of Palestinians in Jerusalem.

High-rise construction
Jerusalem has traditionally had a low-rise skyline. About 18 tall buildings were built at different times in the downtown area when there was no clear policy over the matter. One of them, Holyland Tower 1, Jerusalem's tallest building, is a skyscraper by international standards, rising 32 stories. Holyland Tower 2, which has been approved for construction, will reach the same height.

A new master plan for the city will see many high-rise buildings, including skyscrapers, built in certain, designated areas of downtown Jerusalem. Under the plan, towers will line Jaffa Road and King George Street. One of the proposed towers along King George Street, the Migdal Merkaz HaYekum, is planned as a 65-story building, which would make it one of the tallest buildings in Israel. At the entrance to the city, near the Jerusalem Chords Bridge and the Central Bus Station, twelve towers rising between 24 and 33 stories will be built, as part of a complex that will also include an open square and an underground train station serving a new express line between Jerusalem and Tel Aviv, and will be connected by bridges and tunnels. Eleven of the skyscrapers will be either office or apartment buildings, and one will be a 2,000-room hotel. The complex is expected to attract many businesses from Tel Aviv, and become the city's main business hub. In addition, a complex for the city's courts and the prosecutor's office will be built, as well as new buildings for Central Zionist Archives and Israel State Archives. The skyscrapers built throughout the city are expected to contain public space, shops, restaurants, and entertainment venues, and it has been speculated that this may lead to a revitalization of downtown Jerusalem. In August 2015, the city council approved construction of a 344-foot pyramid-shaped skyscraper designed by Daniel Libeskind and Yigal Levi, in place of a rejected previous design by Libeskind; it is set to break ground by 2019.

Transportation

Jerusalem is served by highly developed communication infrastructures, making it a leading logistics hub for Israel.

The Jerusalem Central Bus Station, located on Jaffa Road, is the busiest bus station in Israel. It is served by Egged Bus Cooperative, which is the second-largest bus company in the world, The Dan serves the Bnei Brak-Jerusalem route along with Egged, and Superbus serves the routes between Jerusalem, Modi'in Illit, and Modi'in-Maccabim-Re'ut. The companies operate from Jerusalem Central Bus Station. Arab neighbourhoods in East Jerusalem and routes between Jerusalem and locations in the West Bank are served by the East Jerusalem Central Bus Station, a transportation hub located near the Old City's Damascus Gate. The Jerusalem Light Rail initiated service in August 2011. According to plans, the first rail line will be capable of transporting an estimated 200,000 people daily, and has 23 stops. The route is from Pisgat Ze'ev in the north via the Old City and city centre to Mt. Herzl in the south.

Another work in progress is a new high-speed rail line from Tel Aviv to Jerusalem, which became partially operational in 2018 and is expected to be completed in 2019. Its terminus will be a new underground station ( deep) serving the International Convention Centre and the Central Bus Station, and is planned to be extended eventually to Malha station. Israel Railways operates train services to Malha train station from Tel Aviv via Beit Shemesh.

Begin Expressway is one of Jerusalem's major north–south thoroughfares; it runs on the western side of the city, merging in the north with Route 443, which continues toward Tel Aviv. Route 60 runs through the centre of the city near the Green Line between East and West Jerusalem. Construction is progressing on parts of a  ring road around the city, fostering faster connection between the suburbs. The eastern half of the project was conceptualized decades ago, but reaction to the proposed highway is still mixed.

Airport

The Tel Aviv–Jerusalem railway runs non-stop from Jerusalem–Yitzhak Navon railway station to the airport and began operation in 2018.

In the past, Jerusalem was also served by the local Atarot Airport. Atarot ceased operation in 2000.

Education
Universities

Jerusalem is home to several prestigious universities offering courses in Hebrew, Arabic and English.

Founded in 1925, the Hebrew University of Jerusalem has been ranked among the top 100 schools in the world. The Board of Governors has included such prominent Jewish intellectuals as Albert Einstein and Sigmund Freud. The university has produced several Nobel laureates; recent winners associated with Hebrew University include Avram Hershko, David Gross, and Daniel Kahneman. One of the university's major assets is the Jewish National and University Library, which houses over five million books. The library opened in 1892, over three decades before the university was established, and is one of the world's largest repositories of books on Jewish subjects. Today it is both the central library of the university and the national library of Israel. The Hebrew University operates three campuses in Jerusalem, on Mount Scopus, on Giv'at Ram and a medical campus at the Hadassah Ein Kerem hospital. The Academy of the Hebrew Language are located in the Hebrew university in Givat Ram and the Israel Academy of Sciences and Humanities located near the Presidents House.

The Jerusalem College of Technology, founded in 1969, combines training in engineering and other high-tech industries with a Jewish studies programme. It is one of many schools in Jerusalem, from elementary school and up, that combine secular and religious studies. Numerous religious educational institutions and Yeshivot, including some of the most prestigious yeshivas, among them the Brisk, Chevron, Midrash Shmuel and Mir, are based in the city, with the Mir Yeshiva claiming to be the largest. There were nearly 8,000 twelfth-grade students in Hebrew-language schools during the 2003–2004 school year. However, due to the large portion of students in Haredi Jewish frameworks, only fifty-five percent of twelfth graders took matriculation exams (Bagrut) and only thirty-seven percent were eligible to graduate. Unlike public schools, many Haredi schools do not prepare students to take standardized tests. To attract more university students to Jerusalem, the city has begun to offer a special package of financial incentives and housing subsidies to students who rent apartments in downtown Jerusalem.

Al-Quds University was established in 1984 to serve as a flagship university for the Arab and Palestinian peoples. It describes itself as the "only Arab university in Jerusalem". Bard College of Annandale-on-Hudson, New York and Al-Quds University agreed to open a joint college in a building originally built to house the Palestinian Legislative Council and Yasser Arafat's office. The college gives Master of Arts in Teaching degrees. Al-Quds University resides southeast of the city proper on a  Abu Dis campus.

Other institutions of higher learning in Jerusalem are the Jerusalem Academy of Music and Dance and Bezalel Academy of Art and Design, whose buildings are located on the campuses of the Hebrew University.

Arab schools
Schools for Arabs in Jerusalem and other parts of Israel have been criticized for offering a lower quality education than those catering to Israeli Jewish students. While many schools in the heavily Arab East Jerusalem are filled to capacity and there have been complaints of overcrowding, the Jerusalem Municipality is building over a dozen new schools in the city's Arab neighbourhoods. Schools in Ras el-Amud and Umm Lison opened in 2008. In March 2007, the Israeli government approved a five-year plan to build 8,000 new classrooms in the city, 40 percent in the Arab sector and 28 percent in the Haredi sector. A budget of 4.6 billion shekels was allocated for this project. In 2008, Jewish British philanthropists donated $3 million for the construction of schools for Arabs in East Jerusalem. Arab high school students take the Bagrut matriculation exams, so that much of their curriculum parallels that of other Israeli high schools and includes certain Jewish subjects.

Culture

Although Jerusalem is known primarily for its religious significance, the city is also home to many artistic and cultural venues. The Israel Museum attracts nearly one million visitors a year, approximately one-third of them tourists. The  museum complex comprises several buildings featuring special exhibits and extensive collections of Judaica, archaeological findings, and Israeli and European art. The Dead Sea scrolls, discovered in the mid-20th century in the Qumran Caves near the Dead Sea, are housed in the Museum's Shrine of the Book. The Youth Wing, which mounts changing exhibits and runs an extensive art education programme, is visited by 100,000 children a year. The museum has a large outdoor sculpture garden and includes the Holyland Model of Jerusalem, a scale-model of the city during the late Second Temple period. The Ticho House in downtown Jerusalem houses the paintings of Anna Ticho and the Judaica collections of her husband, an ophthalmologist who opened Jerusalem's first eye clinic in this building in 1912.

Next to the Israel Museum is the Bible Lands Museum, near The National Campus for the Archaeology of Israel, which includes the Israel Antiquities Authority offices. A World Bible Centre is planned to be built adjacent to Mount Zion at a site called the "Bible Hill". A planned World Kabbalah Centre is to be located on the nearby promenade, overlooking the Old City. The Rockefeller Museum, located in East Jerusalem, was the first archaeological museum in the Middle East. It was built in 1938 during the British Mandate. In 2006, a  Jerusalem Trail was opened, a hiking trail that goes to many cultural sites and national parks in and around Jerusalem. The Jerusalem Biblical Zoo has ranked consistently as Israel's top tourist attraction for Israelis.

The national cemetery of Israel is located at the city's western edge, near the Jerusalem Forest on Mount Herzl. The western extension of Mount Herzl is the Mount of Remembrance, where the main Holocaust museum of Israel is located. Yad Vashem, Israel's national memorial to the victims of the Holocaust, houses the world's largest library of Holocaust-related information. It houses an estimated 100,000 books and articles. The complex contains a state-of-the-art museum that explores the genocide of the Jews through exhibits that focus on the personal stories of individuals and families killed in the Holocaust. An art gallery featuring the work of artists who perished is also present. Further, Yad Vashem commemorates the 1.5 million Jewish children murdered by the Nazis, and honours the Righteous among the Nations.

The Jerusalem Symphony Orchestra, established in the 1940s, has appeared around the world. The International Convention Centre (Binyanei HaUma) near the entrance to city houses the Israel Philharmonic Orchestra. The Jerusalem Cinemateque, the Gerard Behar Centre (formerly Beit Ha'Am) in downtown Jerusalem, the Jerusalem Music Centre in Yemin Moshe, and the Targ Music Centre in Ein Kerem also present the arts. The Israel Festival, featuring indoor and outdoor performances by local and international singers, concerts, plays, and street theatre has been held annually since 1961, and Jerusalem has been the major organizer of this event. The Jerusalem Theatre in the Talbiya neighbourhood hosts over 150 concerts a year, as well as theatre and dance companies and performing artists from overseas. The Khan Theatre, located in a caravanserai opposite the old Jerusalem train station, is the city's only repertoire theatre. The station itself has become a venue for cultural events in recent years as the site of Shav'ua Hasefer (an annual week-long book fair) and outdoor music performances. The Jerusalem Film Festival is held annually, screening Israeli and international films. In 1974 the Jerusalem Cinematheque was founded. In 1981 it was moved to a new building on Hebron Road near the Valley of Hinnom and the Old City.

Jerusalem was declared the Capital of Arab Culture in 2009. Jerusalem is home to the Palestinian National Theatre, which engages in cultural preservation as well as innovation, working to rekindle Palestinian interest in the arts. The Edward Said National Conservatory of Music sponsors the Palestine Youth Orchestra which toured Arab states of the Persian Gulf and other Middle East countries in 2009. The Islamic Museum on the Temple Mount, established in 1923, houses many Islamic artifacts, from tiny kohl flasks and rare manuscripts to giant marble columns. Al-Hoash, established in 2004, is a gallery for the preservation of Palestinian art. While Israel approves and financially supports some Arab cultural activities, Arab Capital of Culture events were banned because they were sponsored by the Palestine National Authority. In 2009, a four-day culture festival was held in the Beit 'Anan suburb of Jerusalem, attended by more than 15,000 people

The Museum on the Seam, which explores issues of coexistence through art, is situated on the road dividing eastern and western Jerusalem. The Abraham Fund and the Jerusalem Intercultural Centre (JICC) promote joint Jewish-Palestinian cultural projects. The Jerusalem Centre for Middle Eastern Music and Dance is open to Arabs and Jews and offers workshops on Jewish-Arab dialogue through the arts. The Jewish-Arab Youth Orchestra performs both European classical and Middle Eastern music. In 2008, the Tolerance Monument, an outdoor sculpture by Czesław Dźwigaj, was erected on a hill between Jewish Armon HaNetziv and Arab Jebl Mukaber as a symbol of Jerusalem's quest for peace.

 Media 
Jerusalem is the state broadcasting centre of Israel. The Israel Broadcasting Authority's main office is located in Jerusalem, as well as the TV and radio studios for Israel Radio, Channel 2, Channel 10, and part of the radio studios of BBC News. The Jerusalem Post and The Times of Israel are also headquartered in Jerusalem. Local newspapers include Kol Ha'Ir and The Jerusalem Times. God TV, an international Christian television network is also based in the city.

 Sports 

The two most popular sports are football (soccer) and basketball. Beitar Jerusalem Football Club is one of the most well known in Israel. Fans include political figures who often attend its games. Jerusalem's other major football team, and one of Beitar's top rivals, is Hapoel Jerusalem F.C. Whereas Beitar has been Israel State Cup champion seven times, Hapoel has won the Cup only once. Beitar has won the top league six times, while Hapoel has never succeeded. Beitar plays in the more prestigious Ligat HaAl, while Hapoel is in the second division Liga Leumit. Since its opening in 1992, Teddy Stadium has been Jerusalem's primary football stadium, with a capacity of 31,733 The most popular Palestinian football club is Jabal Al Mukaber (since 1976) which plays in West Bank Premier League. The club hails from Mount Scopus at Jerusalem, part of the Asian Football Confederation, and plays at the Faisal Al-Husseini International Stadium at Al-Ram, across the West Bank Barrier.Football and the wall: The divided soccer community of Jerusalem, by James Montague, CNN 17 September 2010

In basketball, Hapoel Jerusalem is one of the top teams in the top division. The club has won Israel's championship in 2015, the State Cup four times, and the ULEB Cup in 2004.

The Jerusalem Marathon, established in 2011, is an international marathon race held annually in Jerusalem in the month of March. The full 42-kilometre race begins at the Knesset, passes through Mount Scopus and the Old City's Armenian Quarter, and concludes at Sacher Park. In 2012, the Jerusalem Marathon drew 15,000 runners, including 1,500 from fifty countries outside Israel.

A popular non-competitive sports event is the Jerusalem March, held annually during the Sukkot festival.

International relations

 Jerusalem is twinned with
 Prague, Czech Republic
 Ayabe, Japan
 New York City, United States (since 1993) Partner city
 Marseille, France
 Kyiv, Ukraine

See also
Greater Jerusalem
List of people from Jerusalem
List of places in Jerusalem
List of songs about Jerusalem

Notes

References

Bibliography

Gilbert, Martin (1978). Jerusalem: Illustrated History Atlas. New York: Macmillan Publishing.

Further reading

Cheshin, Amir S.; Bill Hutman and Avi Melamed (1999). Separate and Unequal: the Inside Story of Israeli Rule in East Jerusalem. Harvard University Press. .
Cline, Eric (2004). Jerusalem Besieged: From Ancient Canaan to Modern Israel. Ann Arbor: University of Michigan Press. .
Collins, Larry, and La Pierre, Dominique (1988). O Jerusalem!. New York: Simon & Schuster .
Gold, Dore (2007) The Fight for Jerusalem: Radical Islam, The West, and the Future of the Holy City. International Publishing Company J-M, Ltd. .
Köchler, Hans (1981) The Legal Aspects of the Palestine Problem with Special Regard to the Question of Jerusalem Vienna: Braumüller .The Holy Cities: Jerusalem produced by Danae Film Production, distributed by HDH Communications; 2006
Wasserstein, Bernard (2002) Divided Jerusalem: The Struggle for the Holy City New Haven and London: Yale University Press. .
"Keys to Jerusalem: A Brief Overview", The Royal Islamic Strategic Studies Center, Amman, Jordan, 2010.
Sebag Montefiore, Simon (2011) Jerusalem: The Biography, London: Weidenfeld and Nicolson, .
Young, Robb A (2012) Hezekiah in History and Tradition Brill Global Oriental Hotei Publishing, Netherlands.
 Klein, Konstantin M.: Wienand, Johannes (2022) (eds.): City of Caesar, City of God: Constantinople and Jerusalem in Late Antiquity.'' De Gruyter, Berlin 2022, ISBN 978-3-11-071720-4. doi: https://doi.org/10.1515/9783110718447.
John D. Hosler, _Jerusalem Falls: Seven Centuries of War and Peace_ (London and New Haven: Yale University Press, 2022),

External links

 of the Jerusalem Municipality
What makes Jerusalem so holy? BBC
The Status of Jerusalem. United Nations document related to the dispute over the city
English translation of the Jerusalem Law, the Israeli law making Jerusalem the capital of Israel
Jerusalem Virtual Library, joint project by Al-Quds University and the Hebrew University of Jerusalem
Official website of the Hebrew University of Jerusalem, the city's foremost institution of higher education
Official website of Al-Quds University, the only Palestinian university in Jerusalem

 
Ancient Hebrew pilgrimage sites
Ancient Jewish settlements of Judaea
Arab Christian communities in Israel
Capitals in Asia
Capitals in the State of Palestine
Christian holy places
Cities in Israel
Cities in Jerusalem District
Cities in the State of Palestine
Disputed territories in Asia
Hebrew Bible cities
Holy cities
Islamic holy places
Jerusalem Governorate
Jewish holy places
Land of Israel
Mixed Israeli communities
New Testament cities
Orthodox Jewish communities
Populated places established in the 5th millennium BC
Territorial disputes of Israel
Torah cities
Holy cities of Judaism
Amarna letters locations